Tlou is a given name and surname. People with that name include:

Surname
 Sheila Tlou, former Botswanan minister of health
 Thomas Tlou (1932–2010), Botswanan academic and diplomat

Given name
 Tlou Molekwane (born 1989), South African soccer player
 Tlou Segolela (born 1988), South African soccer player

See also
 The Last of Us (disambiguation)